Ammoglanis diaphanus is a species of pencil catfish is found in a stream tributary to Javaés River, in the Araguaia River basin in Brazil.

References

Trichomycteridae
Catfish of South America
Fish of Brazil
Taxa named by Wilson José Eduardo Moreira da Costa
Fish described in 1994